The Nahuas are a group of the indigenous people of Mexico, El Salvador, Guatemala, Honduras, and Nicaragua. They comprise the largest indigenous group in Mexico and second largest in El Salvador. The Mexica (Aztecs) were of Nahua ethnicity, and the Toltecs are often thought to have been as well, though in the pre-Columbian period Nahuas were subdivided into many groups that did not necessarily share a common identity. 

Their Nahuan languages, or Nahuatl, consist of many variants, several of which are mutually unintelligible. About 1.5 million Nahuas speak Nahuatl and another million speak only Spanish. Fewer than 1,000 native speakers of Nahuatl remain in El Salvador.

It is suggested that the Nahua peoples originated near Aridoamerica, in regions of the present day Mexican states of Durango and Nayarit or the Bajío region. They split off from the other Uto-Aztecan speaking peoples and migrated into central Mexico around 500 CE. The Nahua then settled in and around the Basin of Mexico and spread out to become the dominant people in central Mexico. However, Nahuatl-speaking populations were present in smaller populations throughout Mesoamerica.

Nomenclature
The name  is derived from the Nahuatl word-root  , which generally means "audible, intelligible, clear" with different derivations including "language" (hence   "to speak clearly" and   both "something that makes an agreeble sound" and "someone who speaks well or speak one's own language").

The Nahuas are also sometimes referred to as Aztecs. Using this term for the Nahuas has generally fallen out of favor in scholarship, though it is still used for the Aztec Empire. They have also been called   (singular),   (plural) or in Spanish   "Mexicans", after the Mexica, the Nahua tribe which founded the Aztec Empire.

Geography

At the turn of the 16th century, Nahua populations occupied territories ranging across Mesoamerica as far south as Panama. However, their core area was Central Mexico, including the Valley of Mexico, the Toluca Valley, the eastern half of the Balsas River basin, and modern-day Tlaxcala and most of Puebla, although other linguistic and ethnic groups lived in these areas as well. They were also present in large numbers in El Salvador, southeastern Veracruz, and Colima and coastal Michoacan. Classical Nahuatl was a lingua franca in Central Mexico before the Spanish conquest due to Aztec hegemony, and its role was not only preserved but expanded in the initial stage of colonial rule, encouraged by the Spaniards as a literary language and tool to convert diverse Mesoamerican peoples. There are many Nahuatl place names in regions where Nahuas were not the most populous group (including the names of Guatemala and several Mexican states), due to pre-Hispanic Aztec expansion, Spanish invasions in which Tlaxcaltecs served as the main force, and the usage of Nahuatl as a lingua franca.

The last of the southern Nahua populations today are the Pipil of El Salvador. Nahua populations in Mexico are centered in the middle of the country, with most speakers in the states of Puebla, Veracruz, Hidalgo, Guerrero and San Luis Potosí. However, smaller populations are spread throughout the country due to recent population movements within Mexico. Within the last 50 years, Nahua populations have appeared in the United States, particularly in New York City, Los Angeles, and Houston.

History

Pre-conquest period

Archaeological, historical and linguistic evidence suggest that the Nahuas originally came from the deserts of northern Mexico (Aridoamerica) and migrated into central Mexico in several waves. The presence of the Mexicanero people (who speak a Nahuatl variant) in this area until the present day affirms this theory. 
Before the Nahuas entered Mesoamerica, they were probably living for a while in northwestern Mexico alongside the Cora and Huichol peoples. The first group of Nahuas to split from the main group were the Pochutec who went on to settle on the Pacific coast of Oaxaca possibly as early as 400 CE. From c. 600 CE the Nahua quickly rose to power in central Mexico and expanded into areas earlier occupied by Oto-Manguean, Totonacan and Huastec peoples. Through their integration in the Mesoamerican cultural area the Nahuas adopted many cultural traits including maize agriculture and urbanism, religious practices including a ritual calendar of 260 days and the practice of human sacrifices and the construction of monumental architecture and the use of logographic writing.

Around 1000 CE the Toltec people, normally assumed to have been of Nahua ethnicity, established dominion over much of central Mexico which they ruled from Tollan Xicocotitlan.

From this period on the Nahua were the dominant ethnic group in the Valley of Mexico and far beyond, and migrations kept coming in from the north. After the fall of the Toltecs a period of large population movements followed and some Nahua groups such as the Pipil and Nicarao arrived as far south as Nicaragua. And in central Mexico different Nahua groups based in their different "Altepetl" city-states fought for political dominance. The Xochimilca, based in Xochimilco ruled an area south of Lake Texcoco; the Tepanecs ruled the area to the west and the Acolhua ruled an area to the east of the valley. One of the last of the Nahua migrations to arrive in the valley settled on an island in the Lake Texcoco and proceeded to subjugate the surrounding tribes. This group were the Mexica who during the next 300 years became the dominant ethnic group of Mesoamerica ruling from Tenochtitlan their island capital. They formed the Aztec Empire after allying with the Tepanecs and Acolhua people of Texcoco, spreading the political and linguistic influence of the Nahuas well into Central America.

Conquest period (1519–1523)

In 1519 an expedition of Spaniards sailing from Cuba under the leadership of Hernán Cortés arrived on the Mexican gulf coast near the Totonac city of Quiyahuiztlan. The Totonacs were one of the peoples that were politically subjugated by the Aztecs and word was immediately sent to the Aztec Emperor (in Nahuatl, Tlatoani) of Tenochtitlan Motecuhzoma II. Going inland the Spaniards encountered and fought with Totonac forces and Nahua forces from the independent Altepetl of Tlaxcallan. The Tlaxcaltecs were a Nahua group who had avoided being subjugated by the Aztecs. After being defeated in battle by the Spaniards, the Tlaxcalans entered into an alliance with Cortes that would be invaluable in the struggle against the Aztecs. The Spanish and Tlaxcaltec forces marched upon several cities that were under Aztec dominion and "liberated" them, before they arrived in the Aztec capital of Tenochtitlan. There they were welcomed as guests by Motecuhzoma II, but after a while they took the ruler prisoner. When the Aztec nobility realized that their ruler had been turned into a Spanish puppet they attacked the Spaniards and chased them out of the city. The Spaniards sought refuge in Tlaxcala where they regrouped and awaited reinforcements. During the next year they cooperated with large Tlaxcaltec armies and undertook a siege campaign resulting in the final fall of Tenochtitlan. After the fall of Tenochtitlan Spanish forces now also allied with the Aztecs to incorporate all the previous Aztec provinces into the realm of New Spain. New Spain was founded as a state under Spanish rule but where Nahua people were recognized as allies of the rulers and as such were granted privileges and a degree of independence that other indigenous peoples of the area did not enjoy. Recently historians such as Stephanie Wood and Matthew Restall have argued that the Nahua did not experience the conquest as something substantially different from the sort of ethnic conflicts that they were used to, and that in fact they may have at first interpreted it as a defeat of one Nahua group by another.

Colonial period 1521–1821
With the arrival of the Spanish in Mesoamerica a new political situation ensued. The period has been extensively studied by historians, with Charles Gibson publishing a classic monograph entitled The Aztecs Under Spanish Rule. and that the notion of making a final will was expected, even for those who had little property. A number of studies in the tradition of what is now called the New Philology extensively use Nahuatl wills as a source.

Stage three (c. 1650 – 1821) Late colonial period to independence
From the mid-seventeenth century to the achievement of independence in 1821, Nahuatl shows considerable impact from the European sphere and a full range of bilingualism. Texts produced at the local level that in the late sixteenth and early seventeenth centuries were sometimes a mixture of pictorial and alphabetic forms of expression were now primarily alphabetic. In the late eighteenth century, there is evidence of text being written in "Nahuatlized Spanish", written by Nahuas who were now communicating in their own form of Spanish. Year-by-year accounts of major occurrences, a text known as an annal, no longer reference the prehispanic period. Local level documentation for individual Nahuas continued to be produced, in particular last wills and testaments, but they are much more simplified than those produced in the late sixteenth century.

Nahuas began to produce an entirely new type of text, known as "primordial titles" or simply "titles" (títulos), that assert indigenous communities' rights to particular territory, often by recording local lore in an atemporal fashion. There is no known prehispanic precedent for this textual form and none appears before 1650. Several factors might be at work for the appearance of titles. One might be a resurgence of indigenous population after decades recovering from devastating epidemics when communities might have been less concerned with Spanish encroachment. Another might be the crown's push to regularize defective land titles via a process known as composición. The crown had mandated minimum land holdings for indigenous communities at 600 varas, in property that was known as the fundo legal, and to separate indigenous communities from Spanish lands by more than 1,100 varas. Towns were to have access to water, uplands for gathering firewood, and agricultural land, as well as common lands for pasturage. Despite these mandated legal protections for Indian towns, courts continued to find in favor of Spaniards and the rules about minimum holdings for Indian towns were ignored in practice.

Labor arrangements between Nahuas and Spaniards were largely informal, rather than organized through the mainly defunct encomienda and the poorly functioning repartimiento. Spanish landed estates needed a secure labor force, often a mixture of a small group of permanent laborers and part-time or seasonal laborers drawn from nearby indigenous communities. Individual Indians made arrangements with estate owners rather than labor being mobilized via the community. The indigenous communities continued to function as political entities, but there was greater fragmentation of units as dependent villages (sujetos) of the main settlement (cabecera) sought full, independent status themselves. Indigenous officials were no longer necessarily noblemen.

National period (1821-present)
With the achievement of Mexican independence in 1821, the casta system, which divided the population into racial categories with differential rights, was eliminated and the term "Indian" (indio) was no longer used by government, although it continued to be used in daily speech. The creation of a republic in 1824 meant that Mexicans of all types were citizens rather than vassals of the crown. One important consequence for Nahua people and other Indigenous people was that documentation in the native languages generally ceased to be produced. Indigenous towns did not cease to exist nor did indigenous populations speaking their own language, but the Indigenous people were far more marginalized in the post-independence period than during the colonial era. In the colonial era the crown had a paternalistic stance toward the Indigenous people, in essence according them special rights, a fuero, and giving support to structures in Indigenous towns and giving Indigenous people a level of protection against those who were not Indigenous. This can be seen in the establishment of the General Indian Court where Indigenous towns and individual Indigenous people could sue those making incursions on their land and other abuses. These protections disappeared in the national period. One scholar has characterized the early national period of Nahua people and other Indigenous people "as the beginning of a systematic policy of cultural genocide and the increasing loss of native languages." Lack of official recognition and both economic and cultural pressures meant that most Indigenous peoples in Central Mexico became more Europeanized and many became Spanish speakers.

In 19th-century Mexico, the so-called "Indian Question" exercised politicians and intellectuals, who viewed Indigenous people as backward, unassimilated to the Mexican nation, whose custom of communal rather than individual ownership of land was impediment to economic progress. Non-Indigenous landowners of estates had already encroached on Indigenous ownership in the colonial era, but now liberal ideology sought to end communal protections on ownership with its emphasis on private property. Since land was the basis for Indigenous peoples'ability to maintain a separate identity,and a sense of sovereignty, land tenure became a central issue for liberal reformers. The liberal Reforma enshrined in the Constitution of 1857 mandated the breakup of corporate-owned property, therefore targeting Indigenous communities and the Roman Catholic Church, which also had significant holdings. This measure affected all Indigenous communities, including Nahua communities, holding land. Liberal Benito Juárez, a Zapotec who became president of Mexico, was fully in support of laws to end corporate landholding. The outbreak of the Mexican Revolution in Morelos, which still had a significant Nahua population, was sparked by peasant resistance to the expansion of sugar estates. This was preceded in the nineteenth century by smaller Indigenous revolts against encroachment, particularly during the civil war of the Reforma, foreign intervention, and a weak state following the exit of the French in 1867.

A number of Indigenous men had made a place for themselves in post-independence Mexico, the most prominent being Benito Juárez. But an important nineteenth-century figure of Nahua was Ignacio Manuel Altamirano (1834–93), born in Tixtla, Guerrero who became a well respected liberal intellectual, man of letters, politician, and diplomat. Altamirano was a fierce anticlerical politician, and was known for a period as "the Marat of the Radicals" and an admirer of the French Revolution. Altamirano, along with other liberals, saw universal primary public education as a key way to change Mexico, promoting for upward mobility. Altamirano's chief disciple in this view was Justo Sierra.

Demography

The Mexican government does not categorize its citizens by ethnicity, but only by language. Statistical information recorded about the Nahua deals only with speakers of the Nahuatl language, although unknown numbers of people of Nahua ethnicity have abandoned the language and now speak only Spanish. Other Nahuas, though bilingual in Nahuatl and Spanish, seek to avoid widespread anti-indigenous discrimination by declining to self-identify as Nahua in INEGI's decennial census. Nor does the census count as indigenous children under 5 (estimated to be 11-12% of the indigenous population). An INI-Conepo report indicates the Mexican indigenous population is nearly 250% greater than that reported by INEGI.

Across Mexico, Nahuatl is spoken by an estimated 1.4 million people, including some 190,000 who are monolingual. The state of Guerrero has the highest ratio of monolingual Nahuatl speakers, calculated at 24.8%, based on 2000 census figures. The proportion of monolinguals for most other states is less than 5%.

The largest concentrations of Nahuatl speakers are found in the states of Puebla, Veracruz, Hidalgo, San Luis Potosí, and Guerrero. Significant populations are also found in México State, Morelos, and the Mexican Federal District, with smaller communities in Michoacán and Durango. Nahuatl was formerly spoken in the states of Jalisco and Colima, where it became extinct during the 20th century. As a result of internal migrations within the country, all Mexican states today have some isolated pockets and groups of Nahuatl speakers. The modern influx of Mexican workers and families into the United States has resulted in the establishment of a few small Nahuatl-speaking communities, particularly in Texas, New York and California.

64.3% of Nahuatl speakers are literate in Spanish compared with the national average of 97.5% for Spanish literacy. Male Nahuatl speakers have 9.8 years of education on average and women 10.1, compared with the 13.6 and 14.1 years that are the national averages for men and women, respectively.

Culture

Economy 

Many Nahua are agriculturists. They practice various forms of cultivation including the use of horses or mules to plow or slash-and-burn. Common crops include corn, wheat, beans, barley, chilli peppers, onions, tomatoes, and squash. Some Nahuas also raise sheep and cattle.

Language
Nahuatl, Pipil

Religion

Notes

References

External links 
 

 
Mesoamerican people
Indigenous peoples in Mexico
Mesoamerican cultures